Vittorina Vivenza (6 June 1912 in Villalba – 3 April 2007 in Aosta) was an Italian versatile athlete.

Achievements

National titles
Vittorina Vivenza has won six times the national championship.
1 win in  Long jump (1927)
2 wins in  Standing long jump (1926, 1930)
3 wins in  Discus throw (1928, 1929, 1930)

See also
 Italy national relay team

References

External links
 

1912 births
2007 deaths
People from Villalba, Sicily
Italian female sprinters
Italian female long jumpers
Italian female shot putters
Italian female discus throwers
Athletes (track and field) at the 1928 Summer Olympics
Olympic athletes of Italy
Women's World Games medalists
Sportspeople from the Province of Caltanissetta